Gudowicz is a Polish family name. It is transliterated from Russian/Belarusian/Ukrainian as Gudovich and Lithuanian  form is Gudavičius.

Lya Mara born Aleksandra Gudowicz (1897-1960), one of the biggest stars of the German silent cinema
Edvardas Gudavičius (1929-2020), historian in modern Lithuania specializing in history of Grand Duchy of Lithuania
Ivan Gudovich (1741-1820), Russian noble, military leader
Andrey Gudovich, Russian noble, military leader and statesman (:ru:Гудович, Андрей Иванович)

Polish-language surnames